The Tabaghat Aa'lam Al-Shia is a twenty-volume encyclopedia of Shia scholars from the tenth to the twentieth century, written by Aqa Bozorg Tehrani. It is  divided into eleven chapters, each dedicated to a century. The name of each chapter was inspired by the number of centuries of the occultation of Mahdi.

References
http://www.tahoordanesh.com/page.php?pid=10562

Shia Islam
Shia bibliography
Books of Shia Rijal

en:Tabaghat Aa'lam Al-Shia